The following table shows the world record progression in the women's 4 x 400 metres relay. The first world record in the event was recognised by the International Association of Athletics Federations in 1969.
15 world records have been ratified by the IAAF in the event.

Records since 1969

References

Women's world athletics record progressions
World record women